The 15 August 1975 Bangladesh coup d'état was a military coup launched by mid ranking army officers in Bangladesh on 15 August 1975. The officers were part of a conspiracy to assassinate Sheikh Mujibur Rahman, the Founding Father of Bangladesh, who led the independence struggle during the Bangladesh Liberation War and later served as the first and fourth President and later in between his two presidential terms served as the second  Prime Minister of Bangladesh from April 1971 until his assassination in August 1975. Sheikh Mujibur Rahman and most of his family members were killed during the coup, with the exception of his two daughters Sheikh Hasina and Sheikh Rehana.

Background

Sheikh Mujibur Rahman won the 1970 Pakistani general election but was denied by the Pakistani military dictatorship the position of the Prime Minister of Pakistan; this was a result of long time political oppression of Bengali citizens of Pakistan who were vocally opposed to the authoritarian tyranny of The Establishment (Pakistan). As the democratic demands and protests continued, Sheikh Mujibur Rahman delivered a speech on 7 March that brought the Bengalis together to become prepared for things to come. On 25 March 1971, as part of Operation Searchlight, the Pakistan Army launched an armed operation killing intellectuals in Dhaka University and the following day Sheikh Mujibur Rahman declared Bangladesh's independence from Pakistan, triggering the 9-month Bangladesh Liberation War that ended with the surrender of Pakistani forces in Bangladesh to an allied force of Bangladesh Mukti Bahini and Indian Armed forces. In 1973, Sheikh Mujibur's Bangladesh Awami League won the first parliamentary election in independent Bangladesh by a landslide. 

During the war, perpetrators of the coup, already hatched the plan of assassinating Bangabandhu Sheikh Mujibur Rahman. Many of the conspirators were army officers who were dissatisfied with the decision of independence as they received benefits from a military run administration and they feared a democratic administration might not provide them with as many benefits as administrations of Ayub Khan and Yahya Khan had been giving them. Besides military officers, career politicians and bureaucrats like Khondoker Mostaq Ahmed and some other ministers who worked in the Pakistani government and Bangabandhu's government were involved in the conspiracy as well because they wanted to be part of Pakistan and blamed Sheikh Mujibur Rahman for the 1971 liberation war. According to these plans, they got involved in scuffles that made it seem they were unrelated to a deep seated conspiracy and intentionally engineered political crises.

In 1973, Major Shariful Haque Dalim and his wife were involved in a scuffle with the sons of Gazi Golam Mostafa, a leader of the Awami League, at a function at the Dhaka Ladies club. In retaliation, some officers and soldiers of the Lancer unit and 2 Field Artillery Regiment of the Bangladesh Army attacked Golam Mostofa's residence. As a result, Major Dalim, Major S.H.M.B Noor Chowdhury, and other officers were charged with breach of discipline. Major Dalim had sought help from President Sheikh Mujib but was refused. Major Sultan Shahriar Rashid Khan resigned from the army over the incident. Major Dalim and Major Noor were among the officers who lost their commissions over the charges of indiscipline. 

In 1974, Major Syed Faruque Rahman had become dissatisfied with the Awami League government. He would often discuss his dissatisfaction with Major General Ziaur Rahman who was the deputy chief of army staff. Ziaur Rahman had suggested that Faruque "do something" about the situation in one such meeting.

Major Khandaker Abdur Rashid was able to communicate Commerce Minister Khandaker Moshtaque Ahmed about the situation in the country. Major Khandaker Rashid, Major Dalim, and Khandaker Moshtaque decided that they must dissolve BaKSAL and remove Sheikh Mujib. Khandaker Rashid informed Major Faruque Rahman, who agreed with the plan, and he was also told that Major General Zia would support them.

Execution of the coup
The mutineers decided to divide into teams, and each team was to be given specific instructions and targets.

Bangabandhu Bhaban

The operation at the personal residence of President Sheikh Mujibur Rahman was led by Major A.K.M. Mohiuddin Ahmed. Major Bazlul Huda was placed in the team as he was the adjutant to the 2nd Field Regiment of Artillery, which was guarding the home of the President. The team also included Major S.H.M.B Noor Chowdhury. Captain Abul Bashar, who was in charge of the guards, had served under Major Dalim.

Some of the guards were killed defending the residence after the mutineers tried to force their way in. Sheikh Kamal was injured defending the residence, and was executed by Captain Huda after the attackers had crossed into the compound. Sheikh Mujib asked "what do you want?" to the mutineers. Major Noor and Captain Huda shot Sheikh Mujib as he was coming down the stairs. Sheikh Mujib's son, Lieutenant Sheikh Jamal, Jamal's wife Rosy, Sheikh Kamal's wife Sultana Kamal, and Sheikh Mujib's wife Sheikh Fazilatunnesa were taken to the bathroom on the first floor. They were shot and killed there by Major Abdul Aziz Pasha and Risaldar Moslemuddin. Major Faruque promoted Captain Huda to major and Subedar Major Abdul Wahab Joardar to lieutenant on the spot. Faruque had arrived and left on a tank. Colonel Jamil Uddin Ahmad, military secretary to the president, was killed on the way to Bangabondhu Residence after he was called by Sheikh Mujib.

The guards surrendered after a brief firefight and were lined up outside the house. Major Noor shot Sheikh Nasser, the brother of Sheikh Mujib, in the reception area bathroom. Major Pasha ordered a Havilder to kill Sheikh Russel, who was crying for his mother. A witness reported soldiers looting the house. A dead policeman was seen at the entrance. Major Huda went to Sher Shah road at Mohammadpur to order 10 coffins from carpenters. Major Huda also removed the bodies the next day through an army escort.

Sheikh Fazlul Haque Mani residence 
Sheikh Fazlul Haque Mani was the nephew of Sheikh Mujibur Rahman and viewed as a likely successor. He was killed in his home along with his wife, Begum Arzu Moni, who was believed to be pregnant at the time. His sons Sheikh Fazle Noor Taposh and Sheikh Fazle Shams Parash survived. His home on Road 13/1 in Dhanmondi was surrounded by 20-25 army personnel on 15 August 1975.

Abdur Rab Serniabat residence
Abdur Rab Serniabat, a former minister of water and brother-in-law of Sheikh Mujibur Rahman, was killed in his home in Mintoo road, Dhaka at 5:00 am. His home was attacked by a team that was led Major Aziz Pasha, Captain Majed, Major Shahriar Rashid, and Captain Nurul Huda. Serniabat's nephew Shahid Serniabat, daughter Baby Serniabat, grandson Sukanto Abdullah Babu, and son Arif Serniabat were also killed in the attack. Three domestic servants were also killed in the attack. His son, Abul Hasnat Abdullah, survived the attack and nine other people were injured in the household.

Artillery support 
Artillery under command of Fauque fired mortar shells towards Dhanmondi and Mohammadpur. In Mohammadpur, 14 people died from the mortar fire near Sher Shah Suri road.

Rakhi Bahini camp
Major Faruque attacked the Jatiya Rakkhi Bahini camp with 26 tanks under his command. The Rakhi Bahini surrendered without incident, Faruque moved towards the residence of Sheikh Mujibur Rahman after the neutralization of the Rakhi Bahini was completed.

Bangladesh Betar 
The main office of Bangladesh Betar (radio) in Dhaka was attacked by the mutineers early in the morning. They quickly disarmed the police stationed there and took control of the radio. Major Dalim and Maj Shahriar were in charge of the operation at the radio station. They controlled the flow of information from there.

Aftermath 

Khandaker Moshtaque addressed the nation from the radio station. His speech, written by Taheruddin Thakur, announced the formation of a new government led by him. Following him, the Chief of the army, his deputy, the chief of naval staff, the chief of the air force, the police chief and Bangladesh Rifles pledged their allegiance to the new government. Khandaker Moshtaque appointed General M. A. G. Osmani as his defence adviser. General Ziaur Rahman was made the chief of army staff on 24 August 1975 and Khalilur Rahman was made the first Chief of Defence Staff of Bangladesh Army.

On 26 September 1975, Khandaker Moshtaque proclaimed the Indemnity Ordinance which protected those involved in the coup legal protection. On 5 October 1975, the Jatiya Rakkhi Bahini (Absorption in the Army) Ordinance was passed with strong support from Ziaur Rahman; which absorbed the Rakkhi Bahini into the Bangladesh Army.

On 3 November 1975, the situation had grown tense with some officers of the Bangladesh Army led by Brigadier General Khaled Mosharraf and Colonel Shafaat Jamil launching a coup to remove the mutineers and restore order to the Army. Justice Abu Sadat Mohammad Sayem replaced Khandaker Moshtaque as president and Mosharraf was made the chief of army staff. The mutineers in the morning had killed former president Syed Nazrul Islam, former prime minister Tajuddin Ahmed and ministers M Mansur Ali and AHM Qamruzzaman in Dhaka Central Jail where they were locked up since the mutiny on 15 August. Zia was placed under house arrest. On 4 November the mutineers were provided safe passage to Bangkok.

On 7 November 1975, Khaled Mosharraf was killed in another coup that restored Ziaur Rahman to the chief of army staff. The coup was led by the revolutionary soldier's organisation and Colonel Abu Taher. Taher himself was executed for the killing of Khaled under the government formed by Major General Zia on 21 July 1976, in order to restore discipline in the Army and prevent any further coups.

In 1976, the military regime of Bangladesh provided the coup plotters with diplomatic jobs. AKM Mohiuddin Ahmed was made the second secretary of the embassy in Algeria, AM Rashed Chowdhury was made the consulate general in Jeddah in Saudi Arabia, S.H.M.B Noor Chowdhury was made the second secretary in the embassy in Tehran, Shariful Haque Dalim was made the first secretary to the embassy in Beijing, and Abdul Aziz Pasha was made the first secretary to the embassy in Buenos Aires, Argentina. They held the positions until 1996, when the Bangladesh Awami League formed the government and recalled them to Bangladesh. They refused to comply and as a result were fired from their positions.

Trial 

Major Faruque, Major Sultan Shahriar Rashid Khan, and former state minister Taheruddin Thakur were arrested on 14 August 1996, the same year Bangladesh Awami League returned to power. Three months later, the Bangladesh Parliament, controlled by Bangladesh Awami League, removed the indemnity Act, making way for trials to start. 

AFM Mohitul Islam, personal assistant to President Sheikh Mujib, filed a charge against the mutineers with Dhanmondi Police Station on 2 October 1996. The Criminal Investigation Department started investigating the case the next day. The CID pressed charges against 20 people on 15 January 1997.

On 12 March 1997, the trial started with six accused in jail and 14 being outside the country. Zobaida Rashid, wife of Khandaker Abdur Rashid, was relieved of charges after she filed a number of appeals, reducing the accused to 19. Other cases filed with the High Court challenged the legality of the trial court and its location, the cancellation of the indemnity act, which delayed the trial. Major Huda was bought from Thailand in 1998, through the signing of an extradition treaty between Thailand and Bangladesh. Dhaka district Justice Kazi Golam Rasul, sentenced 15 accused to death on 8 November 1998. Appeals were filled with Bangladesh High Court. On 14 November 1998 the High Court delivered a split verdict with Justice Md Ruhul Amin upholding the death penalty of 10 of the convicts, Justice ABM Khairul Haque upholding the death penalty of all 15. The case was referred to a third Justice, Mohammad Fazlul Karim, who broke the tie by sentencing 12 of the accused to death.

Then Chief Justice Ruhul Amin constituted an appeal court with five justices: Justice Surendra Kumar Sinha, Justice Md Abdul Aziz, Justice Md Tafazzul Islam, Justice BK Das, and Justice Md Muzammel Hossain. The verdict of the Appellate Division confirmed the death sentences of the 12 convicts on 19 November 2009. Three sought presidential pardons but were refused. On 27 January 2010, Bangladesh Supreme Court refused the convicts application for review. On 28 January 2010, five of the convicts in custody were executed. The hanged were Sultan Shahriar Rashid Khan, AKM Mohiuddin Ahmed, Mohiuddin Ahmed, Syed Faruque Rahman, Bazlul Huda. On 12 April 2020, Captain Abdul Majed was hanged.

The Bangladesh Nationalist Party returned to power in 2001 and reinstated the officers who had been dismissed in 1996 to their diplomatic positions.

Legacy 

Since 1975, Bangladesh had been under different military governments, with democracy being partially restored a few times and permanently in 1990.

Sheikh Hasina and Sheikh Rehana, the two daughters of Sheikh Mujibur Rahman, survived the assassinations of their family as they were in West Germany in August 1975. Sheikh Hasina has been elected four times Prime Minister of Bangladesh, in 1996, 2009, 2014 and 2018.

See also
 Military coups in Bangladesh

References

1970s coups d'état and coup attempts
Coup d'état, August
Coup d'état, August
Military coups in Bangladesh
Bangladeshi coup d'état
Bangladeshi coup d'état, August
Violence in Bangladesh
Mutinies
Military history of Bangladesh
History of Bangladesh (1971–present)
1970s in Dhaka